William Paterson University, officially William Paterson University of New Jersey (WPUNJ), is a public university in Wayne, New Jersey. It is part of New Jersey's public system of higher education.

Founded in 1855 and was named after American judge William Paterson, William Paterson is the third-oldest public institution in New Jersey. William Paterson offers undergraduate, graduate, and doctoral degrees through its five academic colleges. During the fall 2021 semester, 5,838 undergraduate students and 3,100 graduate students were enrolled.

History

William Paterson University was founded in 1855 as the Paterson City Normal School. For more than a century, training teachers for New Jersey schools was its exclusive mission. In 1951, the university moved to the present campus to a site originally known as Ailsa Farms, that was purchased by the State of New Jersey in 1948 from the family of Garret Hobart, twenty-fourth vice president of the United States.

The original manor house was built in 1877 in the style of a castle, and was the home of John McCullough, a Scottish immigrant who made a fortune in the wool industry. It was later purchased, enlarged and made the weekend retreat and summer residence of the Hobart family. Today, the building is known as Hobart Manor and is home of the Office of the President and the Office of Institutional Advancement. Hobart Manor was designated a national and state landmark in 1976.

The university changed its name to Paterson State Teachers College when it relocated from Paterson in 1951. In 1966, the curriculum was expanded to include degree offerings other than those leading to a teaching career. In 1971, it was renamed William Paterson College of New Jersey. The change of name honored William Paterson, who was the state's first senator, its second governor, and a United States Supreme Court Justice appointed by President George Washington, and reflected both the institution's beginnings in the city that also bears his name and the legislative mandate to move from a teachers' college to a broad-based liberal arts institution.

The Commission on Higher Education granted William Paterson university status in June 1997.

Dr. Richard J. Helldobler, former interim president of Northeastern Illinois University in Chicago, Illinois, became the eighth president of William Paterson University. He took office July 1, 2018 to replace the retiring Kathleen Waldron, who had served as the school's president since August 2010 after the retirement of Arnold Speert.

In August 2021, William Paterson University signed an agreement with Academic Partnerships, an online program manager.

In November 2021, hundreds of workers and students protested planned layoffs at the school following a $30 million budget shortfall.

Academics

The university is accredited by the Middle States Commission on Higher Education, Association to Advance Collegiate Schools of Business, Commission on the Accreditation of Allied Health Education Programs, Commission on Collegiate Nursing Education, National Association of Schools of Art and Design, National Association of Schools of Music, and National Council for Accreditation of Teacher Education, among others.

It is organized into five academic colleges: College of Arts and Communication, Cotsakos College of Business, College of Education, College of Humanities and Social Sciences, and College of Science and Health, offering undergraduate, graduate, and doctoral degrees.  U.S. News & World Report in its 2018 edition of Best Colleges ranks the university as number 102 of Regional Universities North with an Overall Score of 49/100.0.

The College of the Arts and Communication grants the Bachelor of Arts, Bachelor of Fine Arts, Bachelor of Music, Master of Fine Arts, Master of Arts, and Master of Music degrees.
The Cotsakos College of Business, named in honor of Dr. Christos Cotsakos ‘73, an entrepreneur, former chairman of the board and CEO for E*TRADE, and generous benefactor to the university, grants the Bachelor of Science, Bachelor of Arts, and Master of Business Administration degrees.
The College of Education grants the Bachelor of Arts, Bachelor of Music, Bachelor of Science, Master of Arts in Teaching, and Master of Education. Students may also pursue certificates.
The College of Humanities and Social Sciences grants the Bachelor of Arts, Master of Arts, and Doctor of Psychology.
The College of Science and Health grants the Bachelor of Science, Master of Science, Master of Science in nursing, and Doctor of Nursing Practice. It also offers several pre-professional programs.
The Honors College offers tracks in several disciplines as well as independent study.

Campus

William Paterson University is on a  hilly, wooded campus in northern New Jersey in the suburban township of Wayne.

Facilities

William Paterson University's buildings include:
 University Hall, an 80,000 square-foot academic building which opened in January 2016 and was funded in part by the Building Our Future Bond Act, is a mix of general-use classrooms, dedicated laboratories, and clinical spaces for programs in nursing, communication disorders, and public health.
The David and Lorraine Cheng Library is the academic knowledge center of William Paterson University.
The expanded and renovated 232,000-square-foot Science Complex features nearly 100 research labs and 50 teaching labs.
The 1600 Valley Road Building, which includes interactive classrooms, the Russ Berrie Institute for Professional Sales with its professional sales laboratory, and the Financial Learning Center (a simulated trading floor).
The University Galleries at the Ben Shahn Center for the Visual Arts presents exhibitions of contemporary art, oversees the university's art collections and offers educational programs.
The Power Art Center accommodates an array of studio arts, including three-dimensional design, photography, sculpture, ceramics, printmaking, woodworking, and painting.
The Nel Bolger, RN Nursing Laboratory is a patient simulation laboratory suite in Hunziker Hall. The lab features computerized patient simulation mannequins, a control station for operating the mannequins, robotic digital cameras to record students practicing patient care techniques, television screens to display the lab sessions, one-way mirrors to allow viewing by professors, and editing facilities for creative electronic DVDs for evaluations of student progress.
Other laboratories devoted to arts and sciences and large areas for environmental research include Hamilton Hall, the communication building, housing TV broadcast studios,  the WPSC radio station and sound engineering arts facilities. Hamilton Hall, originally Hobart Hall, had its name changed in summer of 2019. The reasoning behind the name change was due to the fact that students, particularly first-year freshmen, were confusing Hobart Manor and Hobart Hall for one another. The new name is in reference to Alexander Hamilton, one of the Founding Fathers of the United States and first United States Secretary of the Treasury.
The University Commons, including the John Victor Machuga Student Center with its food court and the Speert Hall dining facility, is the hub of campus life, providing a venue for the entire University community to gather and interact.

Student life

Residential life
The university provides housing for nearly 2,600 students in ten residence halls, including two that opened in 2006. Two residence halls, High Mountain East and West, offer learning communities in collaboration with the university's Honors College, and feature smart classrooms that are used as part of the living/learning experience.

With accommodations ranging from double room suites to apartments, the university's modern, smoke-free buildings range in size from 100 to 400 students and are coed by suite, with four residents sharing a suite or apartment. First-year students start out in traditional residence halls such as Overlook South and North, Hillside Hall, White Hall, Matelson Hall, and Century Hall, while upper-class students and older transfer students experience the added independence of the apartments, Pioneer Hall and Heritage Hall.

The newest residence hall, Skyline Hall, completed construction in 2019.

Organizations and campus activities
Offering an active campus experience for both resident and commuter students, William Paterson University hosts 24 fraternities and sororities and more than 70 clubs and organizations, as well as intramural and recreational activities, peer education, and leadership programs. William Paterson University's Club Sports include Cheerleading, Bowling, Equestrian, Ice Hockey, Rugby, Dance and Track.

William Paterson has been nationally recognized for its alcohol prevention program, which requires freshmen and transfer students to take AlcoholEdu, an online alcohol prevention course to educate students about the consequences of alcohol abuse. In addition, student workers serve as peer health advocates and help to spread the message to their peers about the need to take a responsible approach to alcohol. William Paterson is also an active member in the New Jersey Higher Education Consortium on Alcohol and Other Drug Prevention and Education.

WPSC 88.7 Brave New Radio, William Paterson's student-run radio station, is the headquarters for College Radio Day, an effort to celebrate the importance of college radio. In 2012, more than 500 college radio stations in 20 countries participated in the event.

In 2018, sorority student Jasmine Barkley, who had been elected to the Greek student senate, posted a video along with a white female student from Penn State University, in which she used the n-word in a song; she later posted a video saying that her video was not racist, but the school's administration issued a statement condemning her actions.

Greek organizations

Alpha Kappa Alpha
Alpha Kappa Psi
Alpha Phi Alpha
Alpha Psi Omega (Rho Theta Cast)
Beta Kappa Psi
Chi Upsilon Sigma
Delta Phi Epsilon
Groove Phi Groove
Iota Phi Theta
Lambda Sigma Upsilon
Lambda Tau Omega
Lambda Theta Alpha
Lambda Theta Phi
Lambda Upsilon Lambda
Mu Sigma Upsilon
Omega Delta Sigma
Omega Phi Chi
Omega Psi Phi
Phi Beta Sigma
Phi Kappa Tau
Phi Mu Alpha
Phi Sigma Sigma
Sigma Alpha Iota
Sigma Gamma Rho
Sigma Pi
Tau Kappa Epsilon
Theta Phi Alpha
Zeta Phi Beta

Athletics
The university has 13 intercollegiate sports teams in the NCAA Division III, six for men and seven for women, including NCAA teams in men's baseball and women's softball. The William Paterson University Pioneers compete in Division III of the National Collegiate Athletic Association (NCAA), as well as in the Eastern College Athletic Conference (ECAC) and the New Jersey Athletic Conference (NJAC). The Faculty Athletic Support Team (FAST) was established in 2013 by the Department of Intercollegiate Athletics, The Office of the Provost, and a number of faculty members, to create a formalized program to enhance communication and serve a resource to assist student-athletes with retention, success and growth.

Division III sports

WP women's sports
Basketball
Soccer
Softball 
Field hockey
Swimming & diving
Tennis
Volleyball

WP men's sports
Baseball (national champions, 1992 and 1996)
Basketball
Football
Golf
Soccer
Swimming & diving

Cultural events, lectures, conferences, and art
WP Presents! is the university portal to information about performing arts programs produced and presented by the College of The Arts and Communication. University Performing Arts and University Galleries administrate programs in creative and performing arts including the Jazz Room Series, New Jersey Playwrights Contest, and all public productions in the Shea Center for Performing Arts and the Hunziker Black Box Theatre. Cultural events take place on campus throughout the year, including theater productions, gallery exhibits, and concerts presenting jazz, classical, and contemporary music.

The university's Jazz Room Series, launched in 1978, hosts both William Paterson's student ensembles and visiting professional and renowned jazz musicians. The Jazz Room Series is the longest-running, campus-based jazz concert series in the nation, entering its thirty-sixth year in 2014. The Jazz Room has received over two decades of continuous grant support from the New Jersey State Council on the Arts/Department of State, as well as grants from the National Endowment for the Arts, and the Geraldine R. Dodge Foundation. The series has been featured on national and metropolitan-area media, including recorded broadcasts.
The university has produced the Distinguished Lecturer Series (DLS), which brings speakers from the worlds of politics, government, the arts, literature, science, and business to campus. The series has presented such speakers as New York Yankees and Boston Red Sox general managers Brian Cashman and Theo Epstein, musical theatre composer Stephen Sondheim, New York City Mayor Rudolph Giuliani, former Secretary of State Colin Powell, former British Prime Minister Margaret Thatcher, film directors Oliver Stone and Spike Lee, actor Al Pacino, performer Gregory Hines, writers Alice Walker and Joyce Carol Oates, feminist, social and political activist Gloria Steinem, theatrical producer and director Harold Prince, historian of education Diane Ravitch, and entertainers Penn and Teller.
In 2013, William Paterson University was selected to host the Gubernatorial Debate between Governor Chris Christie and Senator Barbara Buono. The university welcomed more than eight hundred audience members. William Paterson University also hosted the New Jersey Gubernatorial Debate, which featured candidates Chris Christie, Jon Corzine, and Chris Daggett.
Since 1985, William Paterson has hosted the Abram Kartch/Thomas Jefferson Lecture, where Thomas Jefferson scholars have shared their research and scholarship with the campus community and high school students from throughout New Jersey. The series began when Abram Kartch, a retired Paterson businessman and Thomas Jefferson scholar, provided William Paterson University with an endowment to offer an annual lecture for high school students on the relationship between Jefferson's words and thoughts and modern society.
New Jersey National History Day is part of a very rigorous academic program in which middle and high school students compete for a spot in the state history contest held at William Paterson University annually. The program encourages the study of social studies by guiding students to express themselves creatively through presentations of historical topics. William Paterson has been the sponsor of New Jersey National History Day since 1988, and the program brings hundreds of students from multiple schools and districts to campus.
The annual Orlanda Saa Foreign Language Poetry Recitation Contest at William Paterson University offers middle and high school students the opportunity to recite poetry in Chinese, French, German, Italian, Japanese, Latin, Spanish, and ESL. In 2014, the university celebrated its 31st year.
William Paterson's Sculpture on Campus program represents one of the largest collections of public sculpture in New Jersey, and the only higher education institution in the state with a formal program dedicated to placing public sculpture. Twenty-two works are located throughout the campus.

Community and civic engagement

William Paterson University is the only college or university in New Jersey that requires all students to take a three-credit course in civic engagement as a requirement for graduation.
William Paterson signed a partnership agreement with the Paterson Great Falls National Historical Park. The agreement is designed to generate greater use of the Park's historical, cultural and natural resources for educational purposes.

Honors, awards and recognition

University Hall, the new academic building, was awarded a silver citation in the 2016 American School & University Educational Interiors Showcase, a competition honoring excellence in education interiors.
The 2014 Green Design Award for William Paterson's new 1,000 space parking garage for its energy-efficient LED lighting technology from the Passaic County Board of Chosen Freeholders at their annual green design conference held on June 18, 2014.
William Paterson University was recognized in the 2016 list of Top University Sales Programs for its Russ Berrie Institute for Professional Sales in the Cotsakos College of Business. The list, released by the Sales Education Foundation of Dayton, Ohio, highlights William Paterson University as one of the best locations for hiring sales professionals.
William Paterson's solar panel installation ranks among the 10 largest installations at higher education institutions in the United States. The panels provide 15 to 20 percent of the institution's energy needs. In 2012, William Paterson was a finalist for the Second Nature Climate Leadership Awards, which recognize innovation and excellence in climate leadership at signatory institutions of the American College and University Presidents Climate Committee. William Paterson was one of 20 colleges and universities nationwide, and the only institution from New Jersey, named as finalists.
For the third time in six years, William Paterson University's student-run radio station, WPSC 88.7 FM Brave New Radio, was named Best Radio Station in the Nation (among institutions with more than 10,000 students) by the Intercollegiate Broadcasting System (IBS) in March 2017. Additionally, in IBS's first year offering awards in the medium of video, WP-TV, the campus television station, won for Best Sports Report. In 2018 WP-TV won Best Sports Program, Best Variety Program, Best use of Graphics along with Best use of Social Media, Instagram. WPSC also won for Best Sports Play-By-Play Baseball/Softball, Best use of Social Media/Other and Best College Radio Station in the Nation for the second year in a row. WPSC also won the 2018 National Marconi Award for Best Non-Commercial Radio Station in the Nation.
William Paterson University has been honored as a military friendly school for the seventh year in a row by the 2017 Guide to Military Friendly Schools and is included in their online listing at MilitaryFriendlySchools.com. There are nearly 150 veterans and active service students on campus.
William Paterson University's Cotsakos College of Business is included in the 2017 edition of Princeton Review's Best 295 Business Schools. This marks the seventh consecutive year the Cotsakos College of Business has been featured in the book, which is well known for college rankings based on how students rate their schools.
William Paterson University's Financial Planning Program in the Cotsakos College of Business has been named one of the top schools for financial planners by Financial Planning Magazine for the sixth consecutive year.
The College of Education received the Best Practice Award in Support of Global Diversity for 2011 from the American Association of Colleges for Teacher Education (AACTE). The award honors the integration of diversity awareness into educator preparation and was presented to representatives of the program at AACTE's 63rd Annual Meeting and Exhibits in San Diego.
The North Jersey Chapter of the American Foundation for Suicide Prevention presented an award to William Paterson University on October 16, 2011, in recognition of efforts by students and staff members to raise money and awareness for suicide prevention.

Notable alumni
 Richie Adubato (born 1937), former basketball coach in the NBA, who has served as head coach for the Detroit Pistons, the Dallas Mavericks and the Orlando Magic.
 Eric Alexander, jazz musician
 Carl Allen, jazz drummer
 Ronald M. Berkman (born 1947), president, Cleveland State University
 Tom Brislin (born 1973), keyboardist, vocalist, songwriter and producer.
 Thom Brooks (born 1973), political philosopher and legal scholar.
 Kevin Burkhardt (born 1974), sportscaster who is one of the play-by-play voices for The NFL on FOX.
 Joe Clark (born 1938), author, speaker, educator known for his overhaul of Eastside High School made famous by the Morgan Freeman movie Lean on Me
Rod Daniels, Anchorman for WBAL-TV Channel 11 in Baltimore.
Joseph Farah, author, journalist, and editor-in-chief of the conservative website WorldNetDaily (WND).
Tom Fitzgerald, journalist, WTTG-TV Fox 5 News in Washington, D.C. Emmy Award winner.
Jeremiah Fraites, drummer of the Grammy-nominated American folk rock band The Lumineers
Rob Fusari, class of 2008, Grammy Award-winning music producer & songwriter for Lady Gaga.
Samantha Giancola, cast member of MTV's Jersey Shore.
Dana Hall,  jazz drummer, percussionist, composer, bandleader, and ethnomusicologist.
Horace Jenkins, former NBA player.
Justin Kauflin, jazz pianist
Brian Lynch, Screenwriter
Ferit Odman, jazz drummer
Herbert Perez, won the United States’ only gold medal in the Olympic Sport of Taekwondo
Joseph D. Pistone, class of 1965, a.k.a. "Donnie Brasco", FBI agent who infiltrated the Bonanno crime family.
Tyshawn Sorey, Composer, Multi-instrumentalist, and MacArthur Fellowship recipient.
Ray Toro, lead guitar and backing vocalist for American rock band My Chemical Romance.
Grafton E. Thomas, suspect in 2019 Monsey Hannukah stabbing played two seasons of football for WPU.
Dick Vitale, legendary sports broadcaster (graduate degree).
Clinton Wheeler, former NBA player.
Ian Ziering, class of 1988, cast of Beverly Hills, 90210, star of Sharknado movies.

Census-designated place

William Paterson University of New Jersey is a census-designated place (CDP) covering the William Paterson University campus in Passaic County, New Jersey, United States.

It first appeared as a CDP in the 2020 Census with a population of 1,417.

2020 census

Note: the US Census treats Hispanic/Latino as an ethnic category. This table excludes Latinos from the racial categories and assigns them to a separate category. Hispanics/Latinos can be of any race.

References

External links
 Official website

 
Public universities and colleges in New Jersey
Universities and colleges in Passaic County, New Jersey
Wayne, New Jersey